The Nikon F70 (or N70 as it is known in the U.S.) is an SLR camera formerly manufactured by the Japanese Company Nikon. Introduced in 1994, it is the predecessor to the Nikon F80. This camera is known for its unusual user interface which uses a combination of function and set buttons along with the thumb wheel to navigate the nestled settings. It is quite different compared to other Nikon SLR's of the same era.

Specification

Key features

F70D version features built-in panorama mode, which crops the top and bottom parts of the image, producing 13 × 36mm image. It also features data imprinting back.

 3D Matrix Metering using 8-segment Matrix Sensor
 Built-in retractable Speedlight with 3D Multi-Sensor Balanced Fill-Flash
 Vari-Program [P] system
 Large, informative LCD, coordinated in shape and color with the control buttons
 Two 3V CR123A (or DL123) lithium batteries

External links 
Nikon F70 Nikon corporate site. Article retrieved 2012-10-15

F070
F070